Jo Hyeon-jeong (Hangul: 조현정; born July 25, 1978) is a Korean voice actress who joined Munhwa Broadcasting Corporation's voice acting division in 2002 and she also known as Shinbi from South Korea's animated series The Haunted House.

Roles

Broadcast TV
The Haunted House - Shinbi
Futari wa Pretty Cure (Korea TV Edition, SBS)
Ojamajo Doremi (Magical Remi from 2nd - 3rd Series, Korea TV Edition, MBC)
Jimmy Neutron (Korea TV Edition, MBC)
24 (extra guest and replacing Laura Harris by Season 2, Korea TV Edition, MBC)
CSI: Crime Scene Investigation (extra guest, Korea TV Edition, MBC)
CSI: Miami (extra guest, Korea TV Edition, MBC)
The Powerpuff Girls (Korea TV Edition, Cartoon Network) - Ms. Keane, Sedusa, Boomer, Robin Snyder
The Amazing World of Gumball (Korea TV Edition, Cartoon Network) - Gumball Christopher Watterson
My Little Pony: Friendship Is Magic (Korea TV Edition, Tooniverse) - Rainbow Dash
Sonic Boom (Korea TV Edition, Cartoon Network) - Miles "Tails" Prower

Movie dubbing
Six Days, Seven Nights (replacing Jacqueline Obradors, Korea TV Edition, MBC)
The Haunted House: The Sky Goblin VS Jormungandr - Shinbi

Game
Cookie Run: Kingdom - Mala Sauce Cookie
Diablo III (Korea Edition) - Wizard (female)
League of Legends (Korea Edition) - Irelia, Riven, Quinn
MapleStory - Cadena, Shade (female), Edea (The Holy City of Cernium), Avril
Overwatch (Korea Edition) - Pharah
Getcha Ghost-Shinbi - Shinbi
Genshin Impact - Aloy

See also
Munhwa Broadcasting Corporation
MBC Voice Acting Division
Tooniverse

Homepage
MBC Voice Acting division Jo Hyeon Jeong blog (in Korean)

1978 births
South Korean voice actresses
Living people
South Korean YouTubers